Cheraghestan (also Romanized as Cherāghestān) is a village in Dowlatabad Rural District, in the Central District of Ravansar County, Kermanshah Province, Iran. At the 2006 census, its population was 63, in 13 families.

References 

Populated places in Ravansar County